Andrewsfield Aerodrome  is located  west northwest of Braintree, Essex, England, formerly RAF Andrews Field. It has one sock which is of an orange colour.

Andrewsfield Aerodrome functions as an important reliever airport for Stansted airport. It has a CAA Ordinary Licence (Number P789) that allows flights for the public transport of passengers or for flying instruction as authorised by the licensee (Andrewsfield Air Operations Limited).

See also
 RAF Andrews Field the original World War II base

References

External links

Airports in Essex
Stebbing